The Voices for or Voices of groups are a series of loosely related political community engagement groups in Australia. Some of the groups have endorsed candidates to run as candidates in federal elections. The independence of some of the candidates endorsed by some groups has been disputed, with some candidates  receiving significant funding from the Climate 200 fund backed by energy investor Simon Holmes à Court.

History 
Australia has had a number of independents who have successfully won a seat in parliament, although most of them had the advantage of previously being an MP for a major party, or held a high profile position in the community.

Voices groups are locally organised groups channelling growing dissatisfaction with traditional political parties that are not representative of their electorates. The first "Voices" group was founded in the electorate of Indi in 2012 around an identified need for greater democratic engagement at the community level.  there are 38 active Voices groups across 35 electorates in Australia.

Some of the groups are seeking and endorsing a candidate. Most avoid directing their preferences through the use of a how-to-vote card. Some groups are focused on participatory democracy, so are strictly non-partisan and are not seeking or endorsing a candidate. There is also a group seeking to register as a political party, the Independent Voices for the Senate, in order to endorse 'Voices' candidates so they will be 'above the line' on the Senate ballot papers.  No senator has been elected from 'below the line' on the ballot paper since the current 'line' was introduced.

Indi (2012–2019) 
Voices for Indi was established in 2012 following the incumbent Liberal MP Sophie Mirabella rejecting a proposal for greater democratic participation, stating "the people of Indi aren't interested in politics". The organisation established informal forms of participatory democracy by setting up "kitchen table conversations" and using campaign offices as community 'hubs' for political discussion.

When the group presented Mirabella with the report, they felt ignored. At that point their view was the only way to get their needs heard in parliament would be to make the electorate marginal and to force the Liberal party to preferences in order to win the seat rather than winning on primary votes, as they had in every election since the formation of the Liberal party in 1949 when the Nationals were not running. In order to achieve that goal they decided to endorse an independent. The group endorsed Cathy McGowan as their candidate. At the 2013 federal election McGowan received a very favourable preference flow and won the seat by 439 votes. She also won in 2016.

The Indi group does not run a candidate, rather they endorse a candidate and provide the candidate with a volunteer base and advice and expertise when needed.

The organisation inspired the establishment of Voices of Warringah in 2018, who later endorsed the independent Zali Steggall for the Division of Warringah. Zali Steggall defeated the incumbent member of Warringah and ex-Prime Minister Tony Abbott in the 2019 Australian federal election.

McGowan chose not to contest the 2019 election. Voices for Indi endorsed Helen Haines, who ultimately won the election. It represents the first time in Australia that two independents were elected consecutively.

Voices for Indi was used as inspiration and a template for several "teal" independent female candidates running in the 2022 federal election.

Warringah (2019) 
In the lead-up to the 2019 elections, two groups were formed in the division of Warringah, whose MP was former prime minister, Tony Abbott. One was Voices of Warringah which modelled itself on Indi, the other being Vote Tony Out which targeted Abbott directly, claiming that his views on issues such as climate made him a poor fit to represent the electorate.

The group endorsed former Olympic skiing medallist Zali Steggall. Steggall won the election with over 57% of the two candidate vote. She was re-elected in 2022 with a 1.8% swing in her favour.

2022 federal election 
Following the 2019 election in which Voices-endorsed independents won two seats, many other communities started their own Voices groups. These extend across urban, suburban, and peri-urban electorates in metropolitan areas, as well as provincial and rural electorates in regional areas, in all of Australia's states and territories except the Northern Territory.

In early 2021, Cathy McGowan headed a conference for community minded independents to give them support and encouragement to run for elected office. The conference had representatives from 78 of the 151 divisions of the Australian parliament, and counted 28 Voices groups at the time of the conference. Initially the conference aimed for 50 attendees, but over 300 attended. In May 2022 there were 56 Voices groups in Australia, up from 39 in In mid December 2021.

The Voices groups have engendered some confusion in the Australian media which has traditionally framed political discourse in Australia as a struggle between the Australian Labor Party (ALP) versus the long-time Coalition of the Liberal Party, National Party and Liberal National Party (in Queensland).  The Australian's Paul Kelly called the candidates "anti-coalition independents and reported on National's leader Barnaby Joyce's warning to not vote independent."

The various Voices groups are independent of one another but often identify similar issues of concern within their electorates, which are most often focused on addressing issues with government integrity and political corruption and addressing environmental issues, particularly climate change. Most of the Voices groups are focused on participatory democracy and community engagement with some eventually endorsing independent candidates.

Reflecting the values and issues that Voices groups are identifying in their electorates, many of the Independent candidates who have been endorsed by Voices groups have policy positions which align with traditional Liberal policies. A number of the candidates indicated that they had recently voted for the Liberal party Voices of Wentworth endorsed candidate, Allegra Spender, was from a high profile Liberal family.

Nine candidates endorsed by Voices or similar groups won their seat at the election. They had all also been endorsed by Climate 200.

Endorsements 
Former Prime Minister Malcolm Turnbull said of the movement "Indi and Warringah are not 'special cases' but templates for further change if the Coalition cannot deliver on climate." Turnbull has also called the growth of these groups as a "very very healthy development" that allows people to vote for candidates who align with their views.

Ian Macphee who was a minister in the Fraser Government and an MP for Goldstein endorsed the Voices of Goldstein and the broader movement, saying "I believe grassroots activity is imperative and can be done by supporting good independent candidates." The candidate in Goldstein, Zoe Daniel, was also endorsed by Cathy McGowan.

Former leader of the Liberal Party, John Hewson said of the movement "taking the vote for granted has been a mistake from both parties for quite some time and you're starting to see protest movements gain momentum . . . over time, you're going to see it reflected in the ballot box." Former Labor MP, Barry Jones and former Democrats leader, Meg Lees joined Hewson on the board of Climate 200, a fund aiming to financially support independent candidates.

The movement has also received endorsements from former members of parliament, Kerryn Phelps, Tony Windsor and Rob Oakeshott.

Opposition 
Opposition to the movement generally comes from the Liberal Party which is sensitive to the threat of moderate Independents to its socially progressive inner-city electorates, and the National Party which is seeing its support being eroded in regional electorates.

Liberal MP Dave Sharma, who was defeated by Allegra Spender, a Voices candidate, accused Voices candidates of being a single issue candidate. However, Julia Banks, who was an MP for the Liberals before moving to the cross-bench, contends that she was most effective when she became an independent.

Funding 
In September 2021, Senator Andrew Bragg wrote to the Australian Electoral Commission to ask them to ensure that the groups were fulfilling all the requirements for disclosures for political donations. This is despite the fact that the groups were not political parties, and at that stage had not endorsed any candidates.

In December, the federal parliament passed a law to require “significant third parties” to register if they spend more than $250,000 on electoral expenditure in a year. Many of the Voices groups did not fit this criteria.

In November 2021, it was reported that Voices of Goldstein in Melbourne had received a significant donation from David Rothfield, a former member of the Greens, who together with his brother donated half a million dollars of his father's estate to environmental causes as well as to the ALP and Greens.

Voices groups and endorsed candidates at the 2022 Australian federal election

See also
Voices for Indi
Teal independents
Climate 200
Cathy McGowan
Zali Steggall
Liberals for Forests

References

Participatory democracy
Political advocacy groups in Australia